Berkeh-ye Mollai (also Romanized as Berkeh-ye Mollā’ī; also known as Berkeh-ye Mollā) is a village in Kheyrgu Rural District, Alamarvdasht District, Lamerd County, Fars Province, Iran. At the 2006 census, its population was 101, in 25 families.

References 

Populated places in Lamerd County